Joaquín Cardiel (June 2, 1965) is a musician best known for being the bassist in the Zaragoza hard rock band Heroes Del Silencio.

Before Héroes del Silencio

Joaquín started in music very early. His favourite bands were AC/DC, Led Zeppelin, and Status Quo. He began playing guitar on 'Edición Fría' and 'Tres de Ellos'. In 1985 he joined Héroes del Silencio as their Bass player.

He was the only band member that finished his degree. He graduated in Chemistry in 1988 without wasting a single year just when the band was starting to become famous.

Post Héroes del Silencio

Cardiel started recording music in 2021, so far releasing 3 singles. Starting with "India" being his first release , it has having some similar sounds from the "El Espíritu Del Vino" album. He would then release the single "Al Abrigo del Moncayo" and then recently "Magia". He then would release the album, "Emociones" featuring the 3 singles along with other songs

References 

Spanish rock musicians
1965 births
Living people
People from Zaragoza